Francisco Alves da Silva Neto (born 14 September 1998), commonly known as Chico, is a Brazilian footballer who plays as a central defender for Sport Recife.

Club career
Born in Recife, Pernambuco, Chico joined Sport Recife's youth setup in 2014, aged 15. He made his first team debut on 4 April 2017, starting in a 2–2 Campeonato Pernambucano home draw against Salgueiro.

Chico was promoted to the main squad for the 2019 season, but suffered a knee injury in January which kept him out for the most of the season. He still renewed his contract until 2022 in February, and only played for the under-23 side after his return.

Definitely promoted to the first team ahead of the 2020 season, Chico made his Série A debut on 23 August, coming on as a half-time substitute for Sander in a 0–1 home loss against São Paulo.

Career statistics

References

External links
Sport Recife profile 

1998 births
Living people
Sportspeople from Recife
Brazilian footballers
Association football defenders
Campeonato Brasileiro Série A players
Campeonato Brasileiro Série B players
Sport Club do Recife players